The Ontario Regiment (RCAC) Museum is a military museum located in Oshawa, Ontario, Canada.  The museum is composed of a "Static Section" tracing the history of the Ontario Regiment  and a Vehicle Section with more than 100 operational military vehicles.  The Vehicle Section, containing jeeps, trucks, tanks and other military vehicles is the largest collection in North America.  The museum is located on the South Field of the Oshawa Municipal Airport, 1000 Stevenson Rd N, Oshawa, Ontario (50 km east of Toronto, Ontario).

Mission
The museum restores, preserves, displays, and commemorates the service of the Canadian Armed Forces (with an emphasis on the Royal Canadian Armoured Corps, its vehicles, vehicles from its actions, and others) and its role in the history of Canada. It does this through using artifacts to tell the story of the Ontario Regiment from 1850 to the present day and its collection of historical military vehicles to "bring history to life." The museum seeks to honour those who came before and those who are currently serving and to make the history accessible to the public in an engaging, relevant, and exciting way.

Volunteers and supporters
The museum is a non-profit organization with two full-time staff and more than 140 volunteer members. These members act as guides, drivers, and maintainers of the vehicle collection, as well as the first line of restorers to bring historic vehicles back to life.

The museum is a proud member of the Durham Region Community and is often supported by members of the Ontario Regiment, the Ontario Regiment Cadet Corps, Royal Canadian Legion Branches 43 and 637, and 420 Wing (Oshawa)–Royal Canadian Air force Association.  

The museum is also supported by the Royal Canadian Armoured Corp Association (Cavalry), the Royal Canadian Armoured Corps, and the Canadian Forces Directorate of History and Heritage.

The Museum

The grounds and buildings
The museum is housed on the South Field of the Historic Oshawa Executive Airport.  The airport opened in June 1941 under the British Commonwealth Air Training Plan as No. 20 Elementary Flying Training School RCAF Station Oshawa. Only three of the original buildings are still standing.  Potential military pilots from Commonwealth and Occupied countries were trained in this field.  There is one primary museum building composed of the Static or Museum Section, three workshops (not open to the public), a vehicle bay, and the Military Vehicle Conservation Centre.  The Museum has the use of two other building but these are not open to the public.

The Museum Section
The Museum Section documents the story of the Ontario Regiment RCAC from its beginnings in 1866 as the 34th Ontario Battalion of Infantry, through WW1 as the 34th and 116th Battalions, 11th Armoured Regiment (The Ontario Regiment (Tank)) in WW2 and the Ontario Regiment (RCAC) today.  Members of this regiment have served Canada in every military operation since the Fenian Raids.  

The museum recounts the history through the display of artefacts grouped by type and period - Pre-Confederation, South African War, WW1, WW2, Afghanistan.  These artefacts include uniforms, personal items, weapons (deactivated), medals, pictures, and trophies.  The Museum Section can be enjoyed by the visitor alone, but the use of a guide is recommended to get some of the backstories behind the artefacts.

The Military Vehicle Conservation Centre
The Military Vehicle Conservation Centre was added on in 2018 and provided an additional 15,300 square feet for the vehicle collection. While in this section of the museum, visitors will experience the largest operational, historical military vehicle fleet in North America and teams of volunteers maintaining and restoring them.

The vehicle collection
The vehicle collection started in 1976 when the then Honorary Colonel of the Ontario Regiment, Norman Wilton purchased nine Ferret Scout Cars for use as a ceremonial troop. The original nine cars soon grew with the addition of BART -  M4A2(76) W HVSS.  Bart was acquired after WW2 from the US and was used as a training vehicle by the Ontario Regiment until the mid-1970s. Since then, the vehicle collection has continued to grow. Some (but not all) of the current inventory are:

World War Two
M4A2(76) W HVSS - BART and BILLY
M3A1 Stuart 
M24 Chaffee - one of 24 acquired from the US after WW2
M8 Greyhound 
Several CMP Trucks including a Radio Van with serial number 1 built in Oshawa
Universal Carrier
Panzer III - Our Panzer II is a reproduction using authentic German Parts and/or parts cast from original
Hetzer -  The Museum's Hetzer is a G-13 retrofitted to German Army Specifications
Sd.Kfz. 251 - There is a C and D variant.  These are Czech OT-810s retrofitted to German Army Specification.
T-34/85 - Iconic Soviet Tank of WW2
FLAK 88 - One of three in Canada, undergoing Restoration
Willys MB - The Museum has several Jeeps including one used by the Ontario Regiment in Sicily and

Cold War
T54A - Our T54 is in Iraqi colours
BMP-1  - Along with the T54A, this was the bulk of Soviet Cold War Armour
M60 -  The Museum operates a US Army and US Marine Corps M60A3
Leopard 1 - Five Leopards including C1 and C2 variants.
M113 -  Both US and Canadian versions along with engineering, TOW, and Communications variants.
Centurion - Running again after 40 years.
Chieftain -  Mark 10 and Mark 11
FV432 - British Armoured Personnel Carrier
M151 MUTT - Canadian and US Jeep
M551 Sheridan - Air droppable and amphibious tank

Gulf War Era
CVR-T - British Family of Combat Vehicles Reconnaissance - Tracked,  Examples of all members of the family are at the Museum
AVGP  - Canadian Family of Armoured Vehicles - Cougar (Fire Support), Grizzly (Personnel Carrier), Husky (Recovery)
HUMMWV - USMC version with .50 cal mount

Modern Era
LAV III - Iconic vehicle used by Canadian Forces in Afghanistan
M113 TLAV - M113 A3 upgraded for Canadian Service
Sandcat Armoured Patrol Vehicle
Land Rover Wolf

For December 2022, a new exhibit will feature a rare WW2 Howitzer Motor Carriage M7B1, often referred to as the M7 Priest. More than 4,000 of the U.S.-made M7 Priests were built during the war. The tank was used by the Americans, the British, the Canadians and the Free French. Many of the Canadian soldiers who stormed Juno Beach on D-Day advanced in M7 Priests.

Events
The museum often holds special events where the public can watch vehicles of the collection move.

Tank Saturdays
Tank Saturdays are single-day events, normally on the second Saturday of each summer month (May to October). These are themed events with a one-hour display show based on that theme. Often, re-enactors will be a part of the show. Armoured vehicle rides are usually available.  Tank Saturdays conclude with a "Battle Royale" where two tanks and their crews go head-to-head in the museum's tank arena.

Aquino Weekend
Aquino Weekend is a two-day world-class event held during the second weekend in June. There will be two themed one-hour battle demonstrations on both Saturday and Sunday.  Common themes are "WW2 - Western Front", "WW2 - Eastern Front", "Gulf War", and "Viet Nam". Each simulated battle will compose of vehicles, reenactors, firepower and pyrotechnics. There are also vendors and static reenactor displays. Each day concludes with a "Battle Royale" where two tanks and their crews go head-to-head in the Museum's tank arena.

Tank Rides and Experiences
The Museum offers experiences in their historic vehicles. These experiences are more than rides; they can be a full experience working with the crews preparing the vehicle and a complete tour of all the crew positions.

Tours
Group or specialized tours are available.

World of Tanks

The computer game World of Tanks is a partner of the Ontario Regiment RCAC Museum. There is a World of Tanks Gaming station at the museum where visitors can play the game on fast optimized personal computers, with standard WOT vehicles or customized vehicles from the museum.

See also
 The Ontario Regiment (RCAC), Oshawa, Ontario
 Ontario Regiment Ferret Club, Oshawa, Ontario
 Oshawa Military and Industrial Museum, Oshawa, Ontario
 Royal Canadian Armoured Corps

Other tank museums
Musée des Blindés – France
The Tank Museum – United Kingdom
Yad La-Shiryon – Latrun, Israel
Parola Tank Museum – Finland
Military museum Lešany – Czech Republic
German Tank Museum – Germany
Military Museum, Belgrade – Serbia
Canadian War Museum – Ottawa, Ontario
Base Borden Military Museum - Canada
cavaleriemuseum - Amersfoort, The Netherlands
Nationaal Militair Museum – Soesterberg, The Netherlands
Royal Tank Museum – Jordan
American Heritage Museum – United States
Royal Australian Armoured Corps Memorial and Army Tank Museum - Puckapunyal, Australia
Australian Armour and Artillery Museum - Cairns, Australia

References

External links

 The Ontario Regiment (RCAC) Museum official website

1980 establishments in Canada
Museums established in 1980
Regimental museums in Canada
Transport museums in Ontario
Buildings and structures in Oshawa
Military history of Canada
Canadian Armed Forces